Salt Lick Creek is a stream in Lewis County, Kentucky, in the United States. It is a tributary of the Ohio River.

The mineral lick from which Salt Lick Creek took its name was noted by settlers in the 18th century. Salt Lick Creek appeared on maps as early as the 1740s.

See also
List of rivers of Kentucky

References

Rivers of Lewis County, Kentucky
Rivers of Kentucky
Tributaries of the Ohio River